Anand Ashram is a 1977 Indian drama film written and directed by Shakti Samanta, based on a story by film director and novelist, Sailajananda Mukhopadhyay. It starred Ashok Kumar, Uttam Kumar and Sharmila Tagore in lead roles. This film has a Bengali version too with the same title released on the same day, Samanta has previously made another double version, Amanush (1975) with the same lead actors, however this film didn't do well at the box office.

Plot 
Dr. Amaresh lives with his wealthy father, a Thakur, in a small town in India. While the Thakur would like to get Amaresh to marry a woman from an equally wealthy family, he has fallen in love with a poor woman named Asha, and would like to marry her. The Thakur is displeased, and asks Amaresh to leave his house, never to return. A few months later, Thakur's employee, Girdhari, informs him that he has found an abandoned child by the river bank, and would like to adopt him. Initially, the Thakur does not want anything to do with the child, but when he sees it for the first time, he decides to let Girdhari have his way. Years later, young Samaresh has grown up under Girdhari and Thakur's care, and travels abroad to study in order to be a doctor. When he returns, he decides to work with a chemical company. His travels take him to meet a beautiful woman named Sumita, her father, and an elderly man named Doctor. Samaresh is perturbed by this doctor, who seems to know him very well, and wants him to leave his job at the chemical company, and start practicing medicine in the small town where they live. What Samaresh does not know that this doctor is none other than his biological father, Amaresh. What both don't know is what steps the Thakur will take when he finds out that Samaresh is none other than his grandson.

Cast 
Uttam Kumar as Dr. Amaresh Rai Chaudhary
Sharmila Tagore as Asha Rai Chaudhary
Rakesh Roshan as Dr. Samaresh Rai Chaudhary
Moushumi Chatterjee as Sumita Dutta
Ashok Kumar as Zamindaar/Pratap Narain Rai Chaudhary
Asit Sen as Girdhari
Utpal Dutt as Rasharaj Dutta, Sumita's dad
 Anita Guha as Sumita's mom
 Chandrima Bhaduri
Prema Narayan (Guest appearance)
Alankar Joshi as Chandan Dutta, Sumit's younger brother (as Master Alankar)

Production 
After the success of Amanush in 1975 Shakti Samanta cast almost same actors including Ashok Kumar. This is the first time where two legendary actor of hindi and Bengali cinema Uttam Kumar and Ashok Kumar worked together. It's making again in double version. 

This film also shooted in Sandeshkhali Sundarban like Amanush and the Nataraj Studio Bombay. There was a scene in Anand Ashram where Uttam Kumar would come down from a high hill, speak a dialogue with the heroine. So then Uttam Kumar already had two heart attacks. Uttam Kumar rose to a high place at that age with great difficulty. Then the director Shakti Samant understood the mistake and apologized. He says to changing the set. But Uttam Kumar said nothing. The with that body, he ran down the two-storey hill again and did it ok in one shot. Director Prabhat Roy (also the assistant director in the film) remembered the dedication of Uttam Kumar which is bring him to the top and different to the other artists.

During the film production Mohunbagan Footballers in Mumbai at that time to play the Rovers Cup Final of 1977. On the evening, footballers turned upon the set to watching the shooting. Uttam Kumar always being a Mohunbagan fan. Uttam Kumar said to the footballers You should have to win the final and return to Kolkata with the trophy. Mohunbagan really become champions and kept good words of Uttam.

Music 

                  The film had music by Shyamal Mitra, with lyrics by Indeevar

Bengali songs

Prithibi Bodle Geche - Kishore Kumar
Asha Chilo Valobasha Chilo - Kishore Kumar
Tinti Montro Niye - Shyamal Mitra
Valobeshe Dekei Dekhona - Asha Bhonsle
Amar Shopno Tumi Ogo - Asha Bhonsle, Kishore Kumar
Kotha Kichu Kichu Bujhe Nite Hoy - Aarti Mukherji, Shyamal Mitra

Released & Reception
Both the version released at the same time in 1977 while Bengali version which was release at the Durga Puja festival time that generally always being on craze and became all time blockbuster at the box office. Bengali version ran for 26 weeks constantly and become top grossing Bengali film in 1977. 

But the hindi version was not going well like Amanush and doing the average business.

References

External links 
 
 

1977 films
1970s Hindi-language films
Films directed by Shakti Samanta
1977 multilingual films
1970s Bengali-language films
Indian multilingual films
Films scored by Shyamal Mitra